A Bowery Cinderella is a 1927 American silent drama film directed by Burton L. King and starring Gladys Hulette, Pat O'Malley and Kate Bruce.

Synopsis
A financially struggling fashion designer from the Bowery receives assistance from a wealthy theatrical producer who visits the shop where she works, which causes problems with her boyfriend.

Cast
 Gladys Hulette as Nora Denahy 
 Pat O'Malley as Larry Dugan 
 Kate Bruce as Bridget Denahy 
 Ernest Hilliard as Ned Chandler 
 Rosemary Theby as Mrs. Chandler 
 Pat Hartigan as Pat Denahy 
 Pauline Carr as Maisie Brent

References

Bibliography
 Munden, Kenneth White. The American Film Institute Catalog of Motion Pictures Produced in the United States, Part 1. University of California Press, 1997.

External links

1927 films
1927 drama films
Silent American drama films
Films directed by Burton L. King
American silent feature films
1920s English-language films
American black-and-white films
1920s American films